was a Japanese diver. She competed at the 1936 Summer Olympics and finished sixth in the 3 m springboard and 14th in the 10 m platform competition.

During World War II Ōsawa served in the Japanese Army as a nurse and died of an illness six months after the end of military operations in Northern China.

References

1913 births
1946 deaths
Japanese female divers
Olympic divers of Japan
Divers at the 1936 Summer Olympics
Japanese military personnel killed in World War II
Japanese nurses
Imperial Japanese Army personnel of World War II
Japanese women in warfare
Women in World War II
20th-century Japanese women